Siratus lamyi is a species of sea snail, a marine gastropod mollusk in the family Muricidae, the murex snails or rock snails.

Description
The length of the shell attains 40.2 mm.

Distribution
This marine species occurs off French Guyana

References

 Merle D. & Garrigues B. (2008). New muricid species (Mollusca, Gastropoda) from French Guiana. Zoosystema 30(2): 517-526 
 Merle D., Garrigues B. & Pointier J.-P. (2011) Fossil and Recent Muricidae of the world. Part Muricinae. Hackenheim: Conchbooks. 648 pp.
 Houart, R. (2014). Living Muricidae of the world. Muricinae. Murex, Promurex, Haustellum, Bolinus, Vokesimurex and Siratus. Harxheim: ConchBooks. 197 pp.

Muricidae
Gastropods described in 2008